The Ajax-class ships of the line were a class of two 74-gun third rates of the Royal Navy. They were grouped in with the large class of 74s, as they carried 24-pounders on their upper gun decks, rather than the 18-pounders of the middling and common class 74s.

Ships

Builder: Perry, Blackwall Yard
Ordered: 10 June 1795
Launched: 17 January 1798
Fate: Broken up, 1881

Builder: Randall, Rotherhithe
Ordered: 10 June 1795
Launched: 3 March 1798
Fate: Accidentally burnt, 1807

References

Lavery, Brian (2003) The Ship of the Line – Volume 1: The development of the battlefleet 1650–1850. Conway Maritime Press. .

 
Ship of the line classes
Ship classes of the Royal Navy